The following elections occurred in 1961.

Africa
 1961 French referendum on Algerian self-determination
 1961 British Cameroons referendum
 1961 Burundian legislative election
 1961 Ethiopian general election
 1961 Gabonese general election
 1961 Guinean presidential election
 1961 Kenyan legislative election
 1961 Mauritanian presidential election
 1961 Nyasaland general election
 1961 Republic of the Congo presidential election
 1961 Rwandan parliamentary election
 1961 South African general election
 1961 Southern Rhodesian constitution referendum
 1961 Togolese general election
 1961 Ugandan general election
 January 1961 Zanzibari general election
 June 1961 Zanzibari general election

Asia
 1961 Iranian legislative election
 1961 Israeli legislative election
 1961 Kuwaiti Constitutional Convention election
 Philippines 
 1961 Philippine House of Representatives elections
 1961 Philippine Senate election
 1961 Philippine general election
 1961 Philippine presidential election
 1961 Syrian parliamentary election

Australia
 1961 Australian federal election
 1961 Victorian state election

Europe
 1961 Belgian general election
 1961 Danish electoral age referendum
 France:
 1961 French cantonal elections
 French referendum on Algerian self-determination, 1961
 1961 West German federal election
 1961 Greek legislative election
 1961 Irish general election
 Italy: 1961 Sardinian regional election
 1961 Norwegian parliamentary election
 1961 Polish legislative election
 1961 Portuguese legislative election
 1961 Romanian legislative election
 Turkey: 
 1961 Turkish constitutional referendum
 1961 Turkish general election
 1961 Turkish Senate election
 United Kingdom: 
 1961 Birmingham Small Heath by-election
 1961 Bristol South East by-election
 1961 Cambridgeshire by-election
 1961 East Fife by-election
 1961 Glasgow Bridgeton by-election
 High Peak by-election
 1961 Labour Party leadership election
 1961 Labour Party deputy leadership election
 1961 London County Council election
 1961 Manchester Moss Side by-election
 1961 Oswestry by-election
 1961 Paisley by-election
 1961 Warrington by-election
 1961 Worcester by-election

Americas
 Canada: 
 1961 Edmonton municipal election
 1961 New Democratic Party leadership election
 1961 Progressive Conservative Party of Ontario leadership election
 1961 Yukon general election

Caribbean
 1961 Salvadoran Constitutional Assembly election
 1961 Guatemalan parliamentary election
 1961 Haitian presidential referendum
 1961 British Honduras legislative election
 1961 Trinidad and Tobago general election

South America 
 1961 British Guiana general election
 1961 Chilean parliamentary election
 1961 Mexican legislative election

Oceania

Australia
 1961 Australian federal election
 1961 New South Wales referendum
 1961 Paddington-Waverley state by-election
 1961 Victorian state election

See also

 
1961
Elections